Old Germantown Academy and Headmasters' Houses or The Old Campus is a historic school campus, the original site of Germantown Academy, located at Schoolhouse Lane and Greene Street in Philadelphia, Pennsylvania. The academy moved to a new suburban location in 1965, and the site is currently occupied by the Pennsylvania School for the Deaf.

After the founding of Germantown Academy in 1759, the land for the campus was donated by Dr. Charles Bensell, a prominent Germantown landowner and later trustee of Germantown Academy.

The first building on campus constructed was the old schoolhouse complete with its iconic Belfry. The building comprises local Wissahickon schist and is built in the colonial style. Until the move of 1965, the school would hold the title of having the oldest school still using its original building. The schoolhouse was replicated on the 1965 campus in Fort Washington.

The bell that hung in the belfry was first ordered in 1770 and brought over from England on the tea ship Polly. However, due to the tensions with the British crown in the early 1770s, the ship was unable to land and was brought to Chester, Pennsylvania until it could be transported to Germantown.
Seven years later, during the Battle of Germantown, Germantown Academy was used as a hospital and camp for the occupying British army. There are recorded stories that the troops used the Belfry (and its weathervane) for target practice before and after the battle. Today, the original weathervane, complete with a British crown (no longer in use) shows bullet damage. During the same occupation, legend tells that the first game of cricket played in the United States was played on the academy lawns.

Campus additions

Between its start in 1759 until 1888, the campus changed very little even as the school grew in number and in prominence. At the insistence of alumni, a gymnasium was donated for student use. The building was known as Alumni Hall and was later converted into the school chapel after the building of a new gymnasium in 1950. The building was constructed closest to the corner of Schoolhouse Lane and Greene Street and was built in the colonial revival style of architecture.

At the turn of the century, GA had one of the most proactive and attentive alumni bodies in its history. These men proposed an addition to the 1760 schoolhouse from the rear. The addition was known as Sauer Hall (named after Christopher Sauer, one of the founders of the academy and the publisher of the first German bible in America).

In 1920, the academy purchased the adjoining property on Schoolhouse Lane (looking toward Wayne Avenue) known as the Alburger property, and later as the Dove House, and Kershaw Hall. The house had been constructed in the 1760s along with the schoolhouse as a house for one of the early masters of the academy. Over time, it was used by different families and changed from its colonial origins into a building with distinct Victorian architectural traits.

The house hosted George Washington in 1793 briefly during his stay in Germantown during the Yellow Fever epidemic in Philadelphia, Pennsylvania while it was the home of GA German Master, Rev. Frederick Herman. There Washington and some of his former generals were treated to meals and was allegedly used the house for cabinet meetings during the epidemic. 

The house was bought by the academy in 1920 and was restored to its original colonial style in 1937. Originally two stories, a third story was built during its occupation by families. In the renovation, the third story was removed. Also in 1937, the house received an addition (in the same colonial style) which was used for kindergarten classrooms.

The next addition to campus came in 1932 after the death of young alumnus, Edward Wynne Moore,'1903. In honor of his love for his school and the generosity of his parents, Moore Hall was constructed and served as a space for the intermediate grades. The building was constructed in the rear of the Dove House.

The last building to be built before the move to Fort Washington was the gymnasium built to the right of the Dove House (looking toward Wayne Avenue). The gym was built in 1950–51 in honor of the recent GA veterans of the World Wars.

Athletic spaces

In the rear of the nine acre property was an athletic field that served as a football and baseball field and a track, depending on the season. Due to the lack of space, many teams including the soccer and tennis teams had to play at the nearby Germantown Cricket Club. This developed a relationship between the club and the school that would last until the move. As there was no pool on the campus, the swim team practiced at the Germantown YMCA or in the nearby suburbs.

The site was added to the National Register of Historic Places in 1972.

References

A History of the Germantown Academy, 1759-1877, Lippincott, Burbank, 1910
A History of the Germantown Academy, Vol. 2, 1877-1936, Lippincott, 1935

See also

National Register of Historic Places listings in Northwest Philadelphia

Historic districts in Philadelphia
Houses on the National Register of Historic Places in Pennsylvania
Houses completed in 1760
Houses in Philadelphia
Germantown, Philadelphia
Historic districts on the National Register of Historic Places in Pennsylvania
National Register of Historic Places in Philadelphia